Rishi Bhardwaj (born 10 September 1986) is an Indian cricketer. He made his Twenty20 debut on 5 March 2021, for Kandy Customs Cricket Club in the 2020–21 SLC Twenty20 Tournament in Sri Lanka. Later in the year, he moved to the United States. In June 2021, Bhardwaj was selected to play for the Atlanta Fire in Minor League Cricket in the United States.
Seattle Thunderbolts

References

External links
 

1986 births
Living people
Indian cricketers
Kandy Customs Sports Club cricketers
Place of birth missing (living people)